Hankow Road is a street in Tsim Sha Tsui, Kowloon, Hong Kong. It runs in the north-south direction from Salisbury Road to Haiphong Road and is 370 metres in length. It was initially named Garden Road but was renamed Hankow Road after the Hubei city of Hankow in 1909, due to the inconvenience caused by a road of the same name in Central.

See also
List of streets and roads in Hong Kong

References

Roads in Kowloon
Tsim Sha Tsui